Green Creek is a  tributary to the Sandusky River in the northern part of the U.S. state of Ohio.  It connects Mineral Springs at the village of Green Springs to the Sandusky River.

Green Creek was so named on account of the mineral-stained rocks along its course.

See also
List of rivers of Ohio

References

Rivers of Ohio
Rivers of Sandusky County, Ohio